Kukuli (Quechua for white-winged dove) is a 1961 Peruvian drama film directed by Luis Figueroa, Eulogio Nishiyama and Cesar Villanueva. It was entered into the 2nd Moscow International Film Festival. It was the first film to be spoken in the Quechua language.

Cast
 Judith Figueroa as Kukuli
 Victor Chambi as 	Alaku
 Lizardo Pérez as Ukuku
 Emilio Galli as Cura
 Felix Valeriano as Machula (Grandpa)
 Martina Mamani as Mamala (Grandma)
 Simón Champi as Brujo
 Mercedes Yupa as Mercedescha
 Eduardo Navarro as Narrator

References

External links
 

1961 films
1961 drama films
Peruvian drama films
1960s Peruvian films
Quechua-language films
1960s Spanish-language films